FC Taganrog is an association football club from Taganrog, Russia, founded in 2006, it played in the third-tier Russian Professional Football League since it was founded. It was dissolved after the 2014–15 season due to lack of financing.

External links
Official website

References

Association football clubs established in 2006
Association football clubs disestablished in 2015
Football clubs in Russia
Sport in Taganrog
2006 establishments in Russia
2015 establishments in Russia